ETP Fest or ETP Festival is one of the biggest rock music festivals in South Korea founded by rock singer Seo Taiji. ETP stands for Eerie Taiji People.

Performances

2001
The first ETPfest's line up included Seo Tai Ji band.

2002
The line up included Seo Tai Ji band and Tommy Lee of Mötley Crüe.

2004
The line up included Seo Tai Ji band, Hoobastank, Zebrahead, PE'Z, and Pia.

2008

2009
The line up included : Nine Inch Nails, Limp Bizkit, Keane, Seo Tai Ji (via band website), GUMX, Pia, Boom Boom Satellites and Fade.

See also

List of music festivals in South Korea

References

External links
www.etpfest.com

Rock festivals in South Korea
Culture of Seoul
Electronic music festivals in South Korea
Music festivals established in 2001
Music festivals in South Korea